"I'll Find You" is a song by American Christian hip hop recording artist Lecrae, featuring American singer and songwriter Tori Kelly. It was written by Lecrae, Kelly, Natalie Sims, Sasha Sloan, John Mitchell, DJ Frank E and Danny Majic, with production handled by the latter two. The song was released through Reach Records on June 9, 2017, as the third single from Lecrae's eighth studio album All Things Work Together. The song is composed in the key of A-flat major and has a tempo of 135 beats per minute. The song was certified Platinum by the RIAA on February 26, 2020, after selling 1,000,000 units.

Background
In a statement announcing the new song, Lecrae explained the inspiration behind it, saying: "Life is a precious gift. A gift we often take for granted until it is threatened. Pain can be a haunting reminder to appreciate every waking moment. So we wrote a song to share our hope in the midst of that pain. At the time of this song's composition, some of our loved ones were battling cancer. We wanted to encourage them to hold on and tell them we are here waiting, hoping, praying, and fighting with them. Some have been released from their pain forever, others are still fighting. Hold on."

Music video
The accompanying music video released on July 28, 2017 on Lecrae's official Vevo account. the video is in support of the St. Jude Children's Research Hospital, and was directed by Mike Mihail. It was shot at Glendale Memorial Hospital in Los Angeles and a studio in Memphis, and featured the two artists and St. Jude Children's Research Hospital patients. "For me, this video is my heartbeat. It's me showing my own pain, hope and passion for others. I want people to see there's hope in the chaos," Lecrae told People. The video has amassed over 120 million views as of May 2022, 93 million on the official video, and 13 million on the lyric video.

Critical reception
Mark Braboy of Vibe described "I'll Find You" a "soul-stirring song". Tony Cummings of Cross Rhythms felt that the song "has one of the most powerful flows ever uttered by the renowned rapper".

Credits and personnel
Credits adapted from Tidal.

 Lecrae – songwriting
 Tori Kelly – songwriting
 Natalie Sims – songwriting
 Sasha Sloan – songwriting
 Danny Majic – songwriting, production
 John "Johnny Yukon" Mitchell – songwriting
 DJ Frank E – songwriting, production
 Colin Leonard – mastering engineering
 Fernando Cuellar – assistant engineer
 Jason Romero – assistant engineer
 Zach Paradis – recording engineer
 Jacob Morris – recording engineer

Charts

Weekly charts

Year-end charts

Decade-end charts

Certifications

References

External links
 

2017 songs
2017 singles
Lecrae songs
Tori Kelly songs
Contemporary Christian songs
Songs written by Tori Kelly
Reach Records singles
Songs written by DJ Frank E
Songs written by Natalie Sims
Song recordings produced by DJ Frank E
Songs written by Sasha Alex Sloan